Proprioseiopsis latocavi is a species of mite in the family Phytoseiidae.

References

latocavi
Articles created by Qbugbot
Animals described in 1998